Cladura is a genus of crane fly in the family Limoniidae. The majority of species are found in Asia.

Species
Listed alphabetically.
C. alpicola Alexander, 1929
C. autumna Alexander, 1920
C. babai Alexander, 1955
C. bicornuta Alexander, 1955
C. bidens Alexander, 1926
C. bradleyi (Alexander, 1916)
C. brevifila Alexander, 1958
C. daimio Alexander, 1947
C. decemnotata Alexander, 1925
C. flavoferruginea Osten Sacken, 1860
C. fulvidorsata Alexander, 1949
C. fuscivena Alexander, 1955
C. hakonensis Alexander, 1947
C. itoi Alexander, 1955
C. japonica (Alexander, 1918)
C. machidella Alexander, 1934
C. macnabi Alexander, 1944
C. megacauda Alexander, 1926
C. microphallus Alexander, 1955
C. monacantha Alexander, 1947
C. nigricauda Alexander, 1954
C. nipponensis Alexander, 1920
C. oregona Alexander, 1919
C. recurvalis Alexander, 1957
C. sawanoi Alexander, 1957
C. serrimargo Alexander, 1953
C. shirahatai Alexander, 1955
C. shomio Alexander, 1955
C. supernumeraria Alexander, 1957
C. taiwania Alexander, 1947
C. telephallus Alexander, 1955
C. tetraspila Alexander, 1947
C. trifilosa Alexander, 1957

References

External links
Cladura, BugGuide
Catalogue of the Craneflies of the World

Limoniidae
Nematocera genera
Diptera of Asia
Taxa named by Carl Robert Osten-Sacken